L'Anse Creuse High School - North, colloquially known as simply "L'Anse Creuse North", is a public, magnet high school in Macomb Township, Michigan, and serves grades 9-12. It is one of two high schools in the L'Anse Creuse Public Schools district, with the other being L'Anse Creuse High School.

Demographics
The demographic breakdown of the 1,896 students enrolled in 2015-2016 was:
Male - 52.3%
Female - 47.7%
Native American/Alaskan - 0.1%
Asian/Pacific islanders - 1.4%
Black - 9.55%
Hispanic - 3.5%
White - 82%
Multiracial - 3.5%

26.9% of the students were eligible for free or reduced-cost lunch.

Notable alumni 
 Steven Oleksy, professional ice hockey defenseman
 Tyler Conklin, NFL football tight end

References

External links

Public high schools in Michigan
Educational institutions established in 1974
Schools in Macomb County, Michigan
1974 establishments in Michigan